Robert John Docherty (born 11 September 1965) is a Scottish former professional footballer who played as a left winger, making nearly 300 appearances in the Scottish Football League. After retiring as a player, Docherty became a coach, managing Celtic Youth Academy teams and Celtic Ladies First Team. He is currently the manager of Ashfield in the Scottish Junior Football Association, West Region.

Career

Playing career
Born in Glasgow, Docherty began his career at St Mirren in 1982, and also played for Hamilton Academical, Dundee, East Stirlingshire, Hibernians, Partick Thistle, Kilmarnock, Dumbarton, Stirling Albion, Stranraer and Albion Rovers.

Coaching career
After working for the SFA as a youth development officer and tutor, Docherty joined Celtic in 2003. His role included Community Development Manager, Youth Academy Coach, and Head of the academy's Development Centers. In 2006, he was promoted to Head of the Celtic Foundation. Docherty introduced the Celtic Girls' Academy and Senior Teams in 2007 and was manager of the Ladies First Team from 2009 to 2013.

Docherty became manager of Junior side Ashfield in the summer of 2015.

References

1965 births
Living people
Scottish footballers
St Mirren F.C. players
Hamilton Academical F.C. players
Dundee F.C. players
East Stirlingshire F.C. players
Hibernians F.C. players
Partick Thistle F.C. players
Kilmarnock F.C. players
Dumbarton F.C. players
Stirling Albion F.C. players
Stranraer F.C. players
Albion Rovers F.C. players
Scottish Football League players
Scottish expatriate footballers
Expatriate footballers in Malta
Celtic F.C. non-playing staff
Scottish football managers
Association football midfielders
Celtic F.C. Women managers
Scottish Women's Premier League managers
Scottish Junior Football Association managers